Doug Spencer Bowser is an American businessman, currently serving as the president of Nintendo of America. He succeeded Reggie Fils-Aimé as president in 2019, having previously worked for Procter & Gamble and Electronic Arts.

Early career 
Bowser graduated from the University of Utah with a bachelor’s degree in communications in 1984, going on to work at Procter & Gamble from 1984 to 2007, which included serving as the director of customer marketing for the Latin American region from 1998 to 2004, and the company's Safeway customer team from 2004 to 2007. Bowser worked at Electronic Arts from 2007 through 2015, serving as vice president of global demand planning.

Nintendo 
Bowser joined Nintendo of America in 2015 as the vice president of sales and marketing, and was promoted to senior vice president of sales and marketing in mid-2016, where he oversaw the promotion and release of the Nintendo Switch within North America.

In February 2019, Nintendo of America's president and chief operating officer Reggie Fils-Aimé announced his retirement, and Bowser was named as his successor as the company's president in April 2019. In addition to these duties, Bowser represents Nintendo for the Entertainment Software Association.

The fact that Bowser shares his surname with the main antagonist of the Mario franchise, Bowser, drew interest when he was first hired by Nintendo, and was the subject of further humorous reactions online upon his promotion to president. The BBC referred to the case as "one of the most charming cases of nominative determinism ever". Nintendo jokingly referenced the name similarity during their E3 2019 Nintendo Direct presentation. Bowser said he had no issues when such jokes are made, stating "It's a signal to me that we have an amazing, passionate following, and our fans are embracing it. It's ironic that we share the same name, and there are times when it'll be fun and we'll play with it, but we're two very, very different characters. I'm not tired of it at all though."

References

External links
 

1965 births
Electronic Arts employees
Living people
Nintendo people
University of Utah alumni
Video game businesspeople
Procter & Gamble people
People from Bay Ridge, Brooklyn